Christoph Paul Daum (born 24 October 1953) is a German professional football manager and former player. Daum played as a midfielder and was a junior for several clubs from the region of Duisburg. He began his senior career with Hamborn 07 and Eintracht Duisburg, before joining 1. FC Köln in 1975 and being part of the reserve team that won the 1980–81 German amateur football championship. As a manager, he won eight trophies with clubs from Germany, Turkey and Austria. Daum began his football career in 1971 in the youth league with Hamborn 07. He transferred in 1972 to Eintracht Duisburg and then in 1975 to 1. FC Köln, where he played in the amateur league until his retirement.

Coaching career

Early years
After finishing his career as a player, he earned his coaching licence at the DFB and began working in 1981 as amateur coach with 1. FC Köln. In the 1985–86, season he was promoted to assistant coach and in 1986 to the top position. During the 1990 FIFA World Cup, Daum was released from his position by Cologne's president Dietmar Artzinger-Bolten. In November 1990 he transferred to VfB Stuttgart, where he won the German championship in 1992. In the following season Daum committed a mistake in the first round of the European Cup against Leeds United on 30 September 1992 by illegally putting in a fourth foreign player. A replay was scheduled, which Leeds won. The UK newspaper 'The Sun' dubbed him 'Christoph Dumb' following this incident. The VfB missed out on the Champions League and Daum was released. Beginning in 1994 Daum worked with the Turkish club Beşiktaş J.K. in Istanbul. He won the Turkish Cup in 1994 and 1994–95 Turkish league championship title with Beşiktaş J.K. In the 1995–96 season he was sacked after losses to Kocaelispor and Vanspor.

1996–2000
Daum returned to Germany two years later to coach Bayer Leverkusen in 1996. He was very successful at Bayer Leverkusen, winning three second places in Bundesliga in four years of coaching. Following the UEFA Euro 2000, Daum was tipped to become manager of the German national team. The press reported rumours that Daum engaged in cocaine-fuelled orgies with prostitutes. Daum threatened the press and gave hair samples to the authorities to convince everybody about his innocence. The samples showed that he was a cocaine user but he told the press that the hairs were not his. However, one year later, facing the prospect of jail time, Daum admitted he had used cocaine. Meanwhile, his agreement to become national team manager was annulled by the German Football Association on 21 October 2000, and Rudi Völler, the then caretaker, was given the formal job.

2001–2010

As a result of the so-called Daum-Affair he was fired from Bayer Leverkusen and was unable to find a club to work within Germany. While he was still on trial in Germany, he returned to his former team Beşiktaş from March 2001 to May 2002. Afterwards, he moved to Austria Wien on 4 October 2002, where he won another league championship title. Beginning in July 2003, he was head coach at Fenerbahçe. Daum won two consecutive Turkish league championships in 2004 and 2005. While his failure to succeed in the Champions League was often criticised in the Turkish media, the improvements in Fenerbahçe under his management were significant. At the end of the 2005–06 season Fenerbahçe lost the national championship to their arch-rival Galatasaray on the final week of the league, after which Daum resigned. Daum signed for 1. FC Köln on 19 November 2006. The contract ran until 2010. Köln returned to Bundesliga after finishing 3rd in Second Bundesliga in 2007–08 season. Daum left the club on 2 June 2009. Daum signed a three-year contract with Fenerbahçe on 2 June 2009. In his one season in charge Daum lost the league title to Bursaspor and the cup final to Trabzonspor. On 25 June 2010, Fenerbahçe parted ways with him.

2011–14
On 22 March 2011, it was confirmed that Daum had signed a contract with Eintracht Frankfurt as coach after the club has sacked Michael Skibbe following a decline in the Bundesliga in the second half season. He left the club on 16 May, two days after the club's relegation was confirmed. Daum took charge of just seven games and failed to manage a victory, his record of three draws and four defeats insufficient to beat the drop. On 9 November 2011, after pausing for six months, Daum took over as head coach of the Belgian Club Brugge. Starting from a good defensive organisation, Brugge won four domestic matches 1–0 under Daum, and also a 3–4 fight back victory over NK Maribor in the Europa League group stage, after Club Brugge were still down 3–0 17 minutes before time. He led Brugge to the 2nd place in the 2011–12 season. Following the end of the season, he asked Brugge to leave his position as head coach due to his family reasons and the club accepted his decision. On 14 August 2013, Daum took over as head coach of Bursaspor. He was sacked on 24 March 2014.

2016–17: Romania national team 
On 7 July 2016, after two years of pause from coaching, Daum started his first experience at a national team after agreeing terms with Romania. He became the third foreign manager in the history to coach the Romanian team. It was reported that he signed a two-year contract which would automatically extend until 2020 if he manages to qualify the team to the 2018 FIFA World Cup. He was sacked in September 2017, after yet another disappointing World Cup qualifying campaign where Romania failed to qualify. He received €135,000 in compensation for his termination.

Honours

Player
1. FC Köln II
German amateur football championship: 1980–81

Manager

1. FC Köln
 Bundesliga: runner up 1988–89, 1989–90

VfB Stuttgart
 Bundesliga: 1991–92
 DFL-Supercup: 1992

Beşiktaş
 Turkish Cup: 1993–94, runner up 2001–02
 Turkish Super Cup: 1993–94, runner up 1994–95
 Süper Lig: 1994–95

Bayer Leverkusen
 Bundesliga: runner up 1996–97, 1998–99, 1999–2000

Austria Wien
 Austrian Football Bundesliga: 2002–03
 Austrian Cup: 2002–03

Fenerbahçe
Süper Lig: 2003–04, 2004–05, runner up 2005–06, 2009–10
 Turkish Super Cup: 2009
 Turkish Cup: runner up 2004–05, 2005–06, 2009–10

Club Brugge
 Belgian Pro League: runner up 2011–12

Managerial statistics

References

External links

 
  

1953 births
Living people
People from Zwickau
People from Bezirk Karl-Marx-Stadt
Footballers from Saxony
German footballers
Association football midfielders
1. FC Köln players
German football managers
1. FC Köln managers
VfB Stuttgart managers
Beşiktaş J.K. managers
Bayer 04 Leverkusen managers
FK Austria Wien managers
Fenerbahçe football managers
Eintracht Frankfurt managers
Club Brugge KV head coaches
Bursaspor managers
Romania national football team managers
Bundesliga managers
Süper Lig managers
Austrian Football Bundesliga managers
2. Bundesliga managers
Belgian Pro League managers
German expatriate football managers
German expatriate sportspeople in Turkey
German expatriate sportspeople in Austria
German expatriate sportspeople in Belgium
German expatriate sportspeople in Romania
Expatriate football managers in Turkey
Expatriate football managers in Austria
Expatriate football managers in Belgium
Expatriate football managers in Romania